Joe Barbieri (born December 14, 1973, Naples, Italy) is a singer, songwriter, and producer.

Music career
Born in Naples, Barbieri started his career in 1993 under the production by Pino Daniele. He was a member of the vocal group Neri per Caso between 2000 and 2002.  He has worked as a songwriter for other artists. Although he started out a pop singer, he moved to a more sophisticated style. His music combines world music, jazz, and the tradition of the Italian cantautori. Along his career he dedicated two albums to his vocal jazz heroes: Chet Baker (Chet Lives!) and Billie Holiday (Dear Billie).
His latest album is Tratto Da Una Storia Vera (2021).

Discography
  Gli amori della vita mia (1993)
 Virus (1998)
 Fuori Catalogo (2003)
 In Parole Povere (2004) 
 Maison Maravilha (2009)  
 Maison Maravilha Viva (live) (2010) CD+DVD 
 Respiro (2012)  
 Chet Lives! (2013)
 Cosmonauta Da Appartamento (2015)
 Origami (2017)
 Dear Billie (2019)
 Tratto Da Una Storia Vera (2021)

 Selected duets 
 "Niente Di Grave" (with Jaques Morelenbaum)
 "Rinascimento" (with Paolo Fresu)
 "Un Arrivederci In Cima Al Mondo" (with Luz Casal)
 "Cosmonauta Da Appartamento" (with Hamilton De Holanda)
 "I Fall In Love Too Easily" (with Stacey Kent)
 "But Not For Me" (with Márcio Faraco)
 "Spina Dorsale" (with Musica Nuda)
 "Diario Di Una Caduta" (with Jorge Drexler)
 "Le Milonghe Del Sabato" (with Gianmaria Testa)
 "Un Regno Da Disfare" (with Stefano Bollani)
 "'E Vase Annure" and "Étape Par Étape Par Étape" (with Fabrizio Bosso)
 "Lacrime Di Coccodrillo" (with Chiara Civello)
 "Malegría" (with Omara Portuondo)

References

External links
 Official website 
 
 Joe Barbieri at Discogs

1973 births
Living people
Musicians from Naples
Italian jazz singers
Italian male singer-songwriters
Italian male guitarists
Italian pop singers
Italian record producers
21st-century Italian  male singers
21st-century guitarists
Male jazz musicians